The Pertunmaa church village (also known as Pertunmaa) is the largest village in the Pertunmaa municipality in Southern Savonia. Together with the southern Kuortti village, it is one of the main settlement centers of the municipality. It has a population of 439. It is located between two large lakes, Pienivesi and Peruvesi.

The most significant buildings in the village include the Pertunmaa Church, the wooden cross church built in 1929. The village also has, among other things, a municipal office, Osuuspankki bank, a fire department, a health center, a school (grades 0–9) and two grocery stores, K-Market and Sale.

Traditional Pertun päivät ("Perttu Days") summer events are organized in the village every year.

References

External links 
 Kirkonkylä - Official Site of the Pertunmaa Municipality (in Finnish)

Pertunmaa
Villages in Finland